Laleh Park (Pârk-e Laleh, formerly called Park-e Farah after Farah Diba), is a large recreation area of the Iranian capital Tehran. Laleh (لاله) is the Persian word for tulip, which is also a popular symbol in Iranian culture.

The park is well-kept and has green areas adjacent to Keshavarz Boulevard in the south, The Ministry of Agriculture in the east, Iran's National Carpet Museum to the northwest, and the Tehran Museum of Contemporary Art in the west.

This park (one of c. 800 parks in Tehran) lies in central Tehran and north of Tehran University. Laleh Park is one of the biggest parks in Tehran.

Laleh Park provides pathways for walking and shade for picnics and relaxation. The park has become a popular meeting place for young people and a picnic area for families. Around the park are some popular coffee shops, fast-food outlets, and shopping centres and designer boutiques in nearby Valiasr Square.

See also

List of Tehran's parks

References

Parks in Tehran
Gardens in Iran